In response to concerns that volcanic ash ejected during the 2010 eruptions of Eyjafjallajökull in Iceland would damage aircraft engines, the controlled airspace of many European countries was closed to instrument flight rules traffic, resulting in what at the time was the largest air-traffic shut-down since World War II. The closures caused millions of passengers to be stranded not only in Europe, but across the world. With large parts of European airspace closed to air traffic, many more countries were affected as flights to, from, and over Europe were cancelled.

After an initial uninterrupted shutdown over much of northern Europe from 15 to 23 April, airspace was closed intermittently in different parts of Europe in the following weeks, as the path of the ash cloud was tracked. The ash cloud caused further disruptions to air travel operations in Scotland and Ireland on 4 and 5 May and in Spain, Portugal, northern Italy, Austria, and southern Germany on 9 May. Irish and UK airspace closed again on 16 May and reopened on 17 May.

The eruption occurred beneath glacial ice. The cold water from the melting ice chilled the lava quickly, causing it to fragment into very small particles of glass (silica) and ash, which were carried into the eruption plume. The extremely fine ash particles and the large volume of steam from the glacial meltwater sent an ash plume hazardous to aircraft rapidly high into the upper atmosphere. The presence and location of the plume depended upon the state of the eruption and the winds. The large amount of glacial meltwater flowing into the eruption vent made this eruption so explosive that it ejected its ash plume directly into the jet stream, which was unusually stable and south-easterly. The ash was then carried over Europe into some of the busiest airspace in the world.

The International Air Transport Association (IATA) estimated that the airline industry worldwide would lose  a day during the disruption. IATA stated that the total loss for the airline industry was around US$1.7 billion (£1.1 billion, €1.3 billion). The Airport Operators Association (AOA) estimated that airports lost £80 million over the six-and-a-half days. Over 95,000 flights had been cancelled all across Europe during the six-day airspace ban, with later figures suggesting 107,000 flights cancelled during an 8-day period, accounting for 48% of total air traffic and roughly 10 million passengers.

Background 

The London Volcanic Ash Advisory Centre (VAAC) was responsible for providing information about the ash plume to the relevant civil aviation authorities in the form of Volcanic Ash Advisories (VAA). On the basis of this, the authorities made decisions about when and where airspace should be closed due to the safety issues. Their decisions resulted in the cancellations of flights at airports across the world, not only in those countries where airspace was restricted. On 16 April 2010, 16,000 of Europe's usual 28,000 daily scheduled passenger flights were cancelled and on the following day 16,000 of the usual 22,000 flights were cancelled. By 21 April 95,000 flights had been cancelled.

Before this, the most severe restrictions to air travel in recent times were following the attacks of 11 September 2001 in the United States when all civil air traffic (not just scheduled) in US airspace, and to and from the United States, was grounded for three days.

Professor Bill McGuire of the Aon Benfield UCL Hazard Research Centre said on 15 April that the most notable eruption of the Icelandic volcano Laki which occurred in 1783, would, if it occurred today "have the potential to severely affect air travel at high northern latitudes for six months or more". The last time the Eyjafjallajökull volcano erupted, in 1821, it spewed ash for over a year. Geophysicists in Iceland said that the production of ash from Eyjafjallajökull was likely to continue at a comparable level for some days or even weeks; a geophysicist at the Icelandic Meteorological Office said, "Where it disrupts travel depends on the weather. It depends how the wind carries the ash".

Jet engine tolerance to airborne particles

In 1982, British Airways Flight 9 flew through volcanic ash of Mount Galunggung, Java, Indonesia, causing all 4 engines to shut down. However, the crew restarted all but one of the engines and landed safely. Subsequently, there was an addition to the operations manuals, describing how to deal with volcanic ash.

In 1989, KLM flight 867 was on its approach into Anchorage, Alaska when the Boeing 747-400 flew through volcanic ash from Mount Redoubt causing all 4 engines to shut down. The crew were able to restart both engines on the left wing and landed safely in Ted Stevens International Airport.

Iceland's authorities had been warning airlines for several years, asking them to determine the density of ash that is safe for their jet engines. However, prior to the volcanic events of April 2010, aircraft engine manufacturers still had not defined specific particle levels above which engines were considered to be at risk. The general approach taken by airspace regulators was that if the ash concentration rose above zero, then the airspace was considered unsafe and was consequently closed.

The April eruption of Eyjafjallajökull caused enough economic difficulties that aircraft manufacturers were forced to define specific limits on how much ash is considered acceptable for a jet engine to ingest without damage. On 21 April, the CAA in conjunction with engine manufacturers, set new guidelines which allowed aircraft to fly when there are levels of volcanic ash between 200 and 2000 micrograms (2 milligrams) of ash per cubic metre. These levels were declared by governments, aircraft manufacturers, and airlines not to have safety implications if appropriate maintenance and ash inspection procedures were followed.

From noon 18 May, the CAA further revised the safe limit upwards to 4 milligrams per cubic metre of air space. Any airspace in which the ash density exceeds this limit is categorised as prohibited airspace.

To minimise the level of further disruption that this and other volcanic eruptions could cause, the CAA announced the creation of a new category of restricted airspace called a Time Limited Zone (TLZ). Airspace categorised as TLZ is similar to airspace experiencing severe weather in that the restrictions are expected to be of a short duration; however, the key difference with TLZ airspace is that airlines must produce certificates of compliance in order for their aircraft to enter these areas. Flybe was the first airline to conform to these regulations and their aircraft will be permitted to enter airspace in which the ash density is between 2 mg and 4 mg per cubic metre.

Airspace restrictions in Europe

Under international regulations, all scheduled passenger flights operate under the instrument flight rules (IFR) which requires clearance to be obtained from air traffic control. From 14 April onwards, the controlled airspace was closed in several European countries and no IFR clearances were granted. The airspace of Iceland itself was hardly disrupted in this period (although a change in the wind direction on 23 April caused the main airport to be closed).

By 23 April, the restrictions were lifted over much of Europe through the introduction of new guidelines on volcanic ash density. After this date there were sporadic closures from time to time, notably in the UK, Ireland, and Iceland, but not a blanket shutdown.

Disruptions outside Europe: Canada
Almost every country with an international airport experienced some disruption due to flights to or from Europe being cancelled. Canada was the only country outside Europe recorded as having cancelled any flights due to a risk from ash clouds in its own airspace.

The Canadian airspace was never closed or restricted because of volcanic ash. Although the UK Met Office map of 21 April shows the ash cloud reaching Labrador, Newfoundland, the Maritime provinces, far eastern Quebec, and the Gulf of St. Lawrence, concentrations were expected to be sparse.

On Monday, 19 April, the combination of heavy fog with a warning by Transport Canada and Nav Canada of a 30% risk of volcanic ash reaching St. John's led to the cancellation of several flights scheduled to leave St. John's International Airport, Gander, and Deer Lake. Because of the heavy fog, it is unclear if the ash cloud warning was really the cause of the cancellations and delays in Newfoundland, and most flights returned to their normal schedule within the day. Air Canada said their flights were "subject to some delays due to inclement weather, unrelated to ash cloud." On Tuesday, 20 April, two Air Canada Jazz flights between the Magdalen Islands and Quebec City cancelled stop-offs in Gaspé because of ash over the Michel-Pouliot Gaspé Airport.

Attempts to reopen airspace 

Most airspace started to close from 15 April. However, in the days following there were brief windows free of the cloud at different locations which were exploited to make a few aircraft movements. There then followed test flights and pressure grew to re-evaluate the criteria for safe levels of ash to fly through.

On 16 April a 30-minute break at Manchester allowed two flights to land, and one aircraft to be moved to Florida, empty (as there was no time for passengers to board). At Glasgow, an Air Transat flight to Toronto took off while a British Airways flight from New York, and a Thomas Cook flight from Orlando and Icelandair flights from Keflavik landed.

On 17 April 2010, the president of German airline Air Berlin, in an interview with the newspaper Bild am Sonntag, stated that the risks for flights due to this volcanic haze were nonexistent, because the assessment was based only on a computer simulation produced by the VAAC. He went on to claim that the Luftfahrt-Bundesamt closed German airspace without checking the accuracy of these simulations. Spokesmen for Lufthansa and KLM stated that during their test flights, required by the European Union, there were no problems with the aircraft. On the morning of 17 April Lufthansa moved 10 aircraft from Munich to Frankfurt at low altitude following visual flight rules. There were no problems reported and no sign of damage to the planes. The same day, an Airbus belonging to Ural Airlines attempted flying below the ash clouds from Moscow to Rimini. When the airplane was in Austrian airspace, the crew reported being low on fuel and diverted to Vienna, where the airplane landed safely.

On the morning of 18 April KLM successfully carried out a test flight from Amsterdam to Düsseldorf with no problems. Afterwards, seven KLM planes with no passengers returned from Düsseldorf to Amsterdam. Air France also performed a test flight from Paris to Toulouse. In the evening of 18 April German airspace was partially re-opened for a period of 3 hours allowing a plane of stranded holidaymakers from Faro, Portugal to land at Hanover.

The vice president of the Dutch pilots union said "We are asking the authorities to really have a good look at the situation, because 100 per cent safety does not exist," Mr. Verhagen continued. "It's easy to close down air space because then it's perfectly safe, but at some time you have to resume flights."

In the afternoon of 19 April, German carriers Lufthansa and Air Berlin obtained permission for some flights from and to German airports under Visual Flight Rules. Lufthansa started sending planes to long-haul destination in order to return stranded passengers later that day.

Late on 19 April and early on 20 April, some flights were permitted to take off in northern Europe, including from Scotland and northern England, but Manchester Airport, that had planned to open on 20 April, remained closed because of a new ash cloud. The Civil Aviation Authority announced that all UK airports would be permitted to open from 2200 on 20 April. Twenty-six British Airways long-haul flights were already in the air and requesting permission to land.

By 20–21 April several airlines confirmed that "air service will be resumed in stages" and started publishing lists of selected flights that were "most likely to be operated" within one single day. "Effective Thursday, 22 April, Lufthansa will resume normal flight operations and offer you the usual reliability", claimed the airline at 15:30 on 21 April.

Stranded travellers
The closure of the airspace left five million travellers stranded around the world, of which up to a million were British according to ABTA. Several thousand passengers were stranded in Asia, the United States, and Australia. Disruption was greater than that after the 11 September attacks, for example:

 The disruption had a significant effect on schools across the United Kingdom because it came at the end of the Easter Holidays and many pupils and teachers were among those stranded abroad.
 Swedish and Norwegian charter tourists visiting Mallorca, Canary Islands, Cyprus, or Egypt were flown to Barcelona or Athens and then driven back to Sweden and Norway by bus (a total distance of ≈ from Athens to Oslo by road taking two and a half days without a break).
 Around 600 Mexican middle-school students, ranging from 12 to 16 years old, who had attended a competition in England for foreign students and scheduled to return home on 18 April were stranded for almost a week. Some started to return to Mexico on 21 April and by 24 April most of them were already home.

Stranded passengers were not necessarily given priority over new passengers for return flights. British Airways told passengers in India and China that any free seats were being sold on the open market, and advised them to buy new tickets and seek reimbursement on return.

In addition to being stranded, some travelers also encountered issues with their visas after arriving at destinations unexpectedly:
 At Brussels airport, 200 travelers from Bangladesh were unable to leave the building without a visa.
 Passengers from Kolkata headed for London on an Air India flight were diverted to Frankfurt, where they were unable to leave the airport to seek accommodation because they did not have visas for Germany.
 A group of passengers from the United Kingdom were facing arrest in Delhi over a breach of immigration laws, because they left the airport without visas.

On 17 April the UK Border Agency announced that it would make allowances for travellers who were unable to leave the UK and whose visas had expired, provided that evidence of travel reservations during the travel disruption was presented. Belarus, Serbia, Finland, and Russia also eased visa formalities for affected passengers.

Alternative transport routes

Passengers destined for countries where airspace was closed had to switch to other modes of transport, possibly via airports still open in Portugal, Morocco, and Turkey to the east. Once inside Europe, many people tried to reach their final destination by train or road. People hired coaches, hire cars, and taxis while the train companies reported a large increase in passenger numbers. Eurostar passenger trains were solidly booked, the Eurotunnel car-carrying trains which run through the Channel Tunnel were very busy, and additional services were scheduled. Travel conditions in France were compounded by an ongoing rail strike affecting long-distance trains.

Most UK and Irish ferry routes were exceptionally busy and coach operator Bus Éireann arranged extra Eurolines services between Ireland and England via ferry. 

The websites Twitter and Facebook, as well as other sites like Roadsharing, were used to arrange alternative travel plans involving boats and ships, trains, and other forms of transportation such as cars, as well as to try to find rooms for the night in the cities where they were stuck. As an alternative to face-to-face business meetings, videoconferencing was also used by the European Union, governments, and companies.

Many people who had to travel, particularly those stranded while away from their home countries, faced large costs for unanticipated travel and accommodation at a time of scarcity. Some costs were covered by compensation from airlines and travel insurance, although there were many disputes over payments. Some people incurred large taxicab fares over long distances, such as English actor John Cleese, who took a taxi from Oslo to Brussels and paid €3,000 for the journey.

On 18 April 2010, UK Government ministers announced a plan for flights to land and take off in Spain, and to transport passengers by sea back to the United Kingdom. On 19 April, the cabinet crisis response committee (COBRA) decided that Royal Navy ships should be utilised to repatriate stranded British travellers, in Operation Cunningham. HMS Ark Royal, HMS Ocean, and HMS Albion were deployed, but only Albion was directly involved in repatriation.

After the disruption in transatlantic flight, the Cunard Line said its volume of calls inquiring about booking passage on its ocean liner RMS Queen Mary 2 by stranded air passengers wishing to cross by ship had tripled since the weekend of 16 April.

Criticism of airspace closure
There was much criticism by airlines, which suffered large financial losses, of the airspace closures as unnecessary; however, the EU transport presidency disagreed, saying that "This situation is causing them important losses, but safety is paramount".

Military flying
Some military aircraft which flew during the period of closure suffered engine damage, although no crashes were reported.

On 15 April, five Finnish Air Force F-18 fighter jets on exercise flew into the ash cloud in northern Finland. Volcanic dust was found on the engines of three of the aircraft and a further inspection revealed extensive damage by molten glass deposits inside the combustion chamber of one of the engines. The engines were sent for disassembly and overhaul. As a result, all unnecessary military flights were cancelled except for identification flights to enforce sovereign airspace. Meanwhile, a BAE Hawk trainer with special equipment to sample the volcanic dust was being flown from the 41st squadron in Kauhava. Even short test flights with an F-18 revealed engine damage sufficient to destroy engines.

On 19 April, NATO reported finding molten glass in the engines of at least one F-16, the result of flying through the ash cloud, leading to the scaling-down of U.S. military exercises. Royal Air Force flights to Selly Oak Hospital in Birmingham were grounded, and the United Kingdom Ministry of Defence considered flying British casualties of the Afghan War to coalition countries.

On 23 April it was announced that British Royal Air Force training flights had been suspended following volcanic ash damage to the engines of Eurofighter Typhoon aircraft.

Impacts of the disruption 

The disruption accelerated the integration of the national air traffic control systems into the Single European Sky and the immediate creation of a crisis coordination group to handle future transportation disruptions.

The ash indirectly affected many scheduled cultural and sporting events because key participants were unable to attend, including the funeral of Polish president Lech Kaczyński in Kraków on 18 April 2010.  The funeral was to have been attended by 69 presidents, prime ministers, and other heads of states.  Almost half of these, including Barack Obama, Angela Merkel, José Luis Rodríguez Zapatero, Stephen Harper, and Nicolas Sarkozy, were unable to travel to Poland because of the disrupted air traffic.

There was also a wider impact on the economies of several countries. However, there were some environmental advantages arising from a saving of around 1.3 to 2.8 million tonnes of carbon dioxide emissions.

Many supply chains were affected by the disruptions across the globe, which led to discussions on the importance of supply chain resilience in the aftermath of the event.

Ash cloud maps
The following maps, with the volcano in red, depict the progress of the ash cloud during the period of disruption.

See also

 2011 eruption of Grímsvötn
 Crisis situations and protests in Europe since 2000
 Volcanic ash and aviation safety

References

External links

"Live: Volcanic cloud over Europe" updates on BBC News
"Tracking the Cancellations" The New York Times, 15 April 2010, updated 20 April 2010
 Volcanic Ash Advisory Graphical Forecast for the North Atlantic region

2010 in Europe
2010 in aviation
2010 natural disasters
Aviation accidents and incidents in Europe
Eyjafjallajökull
Weather hazards
Airliner accidents and incidents caused by volcanic events
Aviation accidents and incidents in 2010